Big Eight or Big 8 may refer to:

Sports
Big Eight Conference, a former American college athletic association
Big 8 Conference (California), an American college conference in the California Community College Athletic Association
Big 8 Conference (Missouri), an American high school athletic association in Missouri
Big Eight Conference (IHSAA), an American high school athletic association in Indiana
WIAA Big Eight Conference, an American high school athletic association in Wisconsin

Other uses
The Big Eight, an Irish showband fronted by Brendan Bowyer
Big 8 (Usenet), a group of Usenet newsgroup hierarchies
Big 8 Beverages, a Canadian soft drink company
Big Eight auditors, a group of accounting firms that have since been reduced to the Big Four
Big Eight film studios, a group of American film studios
CKLW, a Canadian Radio station formerly known as The Big 8
"Big Eight", a song by English reggae musician Judge Dread

See also

 Big One (disambiguation)
 Big Two (disambiguation)
 Big Three (disambiguation) 
 Big Four (disambiguation)
 Big Five (disambiguation)
 Big Six (disambiguation)
 Big Seven (disambiguation)
 Big Eight Conference (disambiguation)
 Big Ten (disambiguation)
 Big 12